LVII Panzer Corps was a panzer corps in the German Army during World War II.

This corps was activated in Augsburg in February 1941 as the LVII Army Corps, for the German invasion of the Soviet Union, which commenced on 22 June 1941. It fought in the Battle of Białystok–Minsk and in the Battle of Moscow.

On 21 June 1942, the Corps was renamed LVII Panzer Corps . It fought at Rostov, and then in the Battle of the Caucasus. It fought south-west of Stalingrad and then retreated along the Don. In 1943 it was active in the Donets region and in Kursk. It retreated over the Romanian border before being attached to the 3rd Hungarian Army and transferred to the south of Hungary. There it fought in the Battle of Budapest and ended the war in Silesia.

Commanders
 General of the Tank Troops (General der Panzertruppe) Adolf-Friedrich Kuntzen - From 15 February 1941 to 15 November 1941.
 General of the Tank Troops (General der Panzertruppe) Friedrich Kirchner - From 15 November 1941 to 12 January 1942
 General of the Tank Troops (General der Panzertruppe) Adolf-Friedrich Kuntzen - From 12 to 31 January 1942
 General of the Tank Troops (General der Panzertruppe) Friedrich Kirchner - From 31 January 1942 to 30 November 1943
 General of the Tank Troops (General der Panzertruppe)  Hans-Karl Freiherr von Esebeck - From 30 November 1943 to 19 February 1944
 General of the Tank Troops (General der Panzertruppe)  Friedrich Kirchner - From 19 February 1944 to 25 May 1944
 Infantry General (General der Infanterie) Franz Beyer - From 25 May 1944 to 2 June 1944
 * General of the Tank Troops (General der Panzertruppe)  Friedrich Kirchner - From 2 June 1944 to 8 May 1945

Area of operations
 Eastern Front, central sector - From June 1942 to July 1944
 Southern Hungary - From July 1944 to January 1945
 Silesia - From January 1945 to May 1945

source
 LVII. Panzerkorps on lexikon-der-wehrmacht.de

P057
Military units and formations established in 1941
Military units and formations disestablished in 1945